A sinner refers to a  person who commits a sin. 

Sinner or The Sinner may also refer to:

People
 Carl Ahasver von Sinner (1754–1821), Swiss architect
 George A. Sinner (1928–2018), American politician, 29th Governor of North Dakota
 George B. Sinner, American politician
 Jannik Sinner (born 2001), Italian tennis player
 Martin Sinner (born 1968), German tennis player
 Mat Sinner (born 1964), German musician

Arts and entertainment

Film and TV
 The Sinner (1928 film), a German silent drama film
 The Sinner (1940 film), an Italian drama film
 The Sinner (1951 film), a German drama film
 Sinner, a 1972 Spanish film directed by Jesús Franco, aka Intimate Diary of a Nymphomaniac
 La ragazza dalla pelle di luna, also known as The Sinner, a 1973 Italian film
 Sinner (film), a 2007 film starring Nick Chinlund and Georgina Cates
 The Sinner (TV series), an anthology series based on the novel of the same name by Petra Hammesfahr

Literature
Sinner (Dekker novel), a 2008 fantasy book by Ted Dekker
Sinner (Douglass novel), a 1997 fantasy novel by Sara Douglass
Sinner (Rulli book), a 2011 religious book by Lino Rulli
The Sinner (novel), a 2003 novel by Tess Gerritsen
The Sinner, a 2003 novel by Madeline Hunter

Music
 Sinner (band), a German heavy metal band
 Sinner (Drowning Pool album)
 "Sinner" (Drowning Pool song), 2002
 "Sinner" (Neil Finn song), 1998
 Sinner (Joan Jett album), 2006
 Sinner (Aaron Lewis album), 2016
 "Sinner" (Judas Priest song)
 "Sinner", from the album Magazines or Novels by Andy Grammer

Video games 
 Sinner: Sacrifice for Redemption, a 2018 indie action game

Other uses
 SS-16 Sinner, the NATO reporting name for the RT-21 Temp 2S intercontinental ballistic missile

See also
 Siner (disambiguation)
 Sinnar, a city in Maharashtra, India
 Sinnar taluka, Maharashtra, India
 Sinners (disambiguation)